is a railway station in the city of Tōno, Iwate, Japan, operated by East Japan Railway Company (JR East).

Lines
Iwate-Futsukamachi Station is served by the Kamaishi Line, and is located 39.3 kilometers from the terminus of the line at Hanamaki Station.

Station layout
The station has one side platform serving a single bi-directional track. The station is unattended.

History
The station was elevated to a full passenger station and renamed Iwate-Futsukamachi on 15 December 1924.

The line was nationalized in August 1936, becoming the Kamaishi Line. The station was absorbed into the JR East network upon the privatization of the Japanese National Railways (JNR) on 1 April 1987.

Surrounding area
 FutsukamachiPost Office
 
 Sarugaishi River

See also
 List of railway stations in Japan

References

External links

  

Railway stations in Iwate Prefecture
Kamaishi Line
Railway stations in Japan opened in 1914
Tōno, Iwate
Stations of East Japan Railway Company